China National Aviation Fuel Group Corporation (CNAF) is a Chinese state-owned enterprise. The company owns a 51% stake in China National Aviation Fuel Supply Co., Ltd., one of the largest jet fuel suppliers in China. China National Aviation Fuel Group was ranked 484th in 2016 Fortune Global 500 list.

History
China National Aviation Fuel Group obtained its current name on 11 October 2002. In 2005 a subsidiary with limited liabilities was incorporated under the Companies Law of China on 22 September 2005, as China National Aviation Fuel Supply. The minority shareholders of the subsidiary were Sinopec and PetroChina, the listed subsidiaries of fellow oil giant State-owned Assets Supervision and Administration Commission of the State Council.

The corporation had a controversial net loss in 2004, which resulted by the arrest of Chen Jiulin, president of Singapore-listed subsidiary China Aviation Oil.

Subsidiaries

 China National Aviation Fuel Supply (51.00%)
 China National Aviation Fuel Land Petroleum (100.00%)
 China National Aviation Fuel Logistic (100.00%)
 China Aviation Oil (50.88%)

Equity investments

 Haikou Meilan International Airport (2.08% owned by CNAF Co., Ltd.)
 Shenzhen Petrochemical Exchange

References

External links
  

Oil and gas companies of China
Government-owned companies of China
Companies based in Beijing
Companies established in 2005